List of songs that reach number one in Türkçe Top 20, the Turkish airplay chart in 2007. The list is updated every Thursday by Nielsen Music Control.

External links
 Nielsen Music Control Turkey for the current #1 song, previous number ones may be found via archive.org

Number One Hits
Turkish Top 20 Chart
Lists of number-one songs in Turkey